Alise Stein-Anvelt (also Alice Leevald or Alice Levald; 20 October 1900 Vardi Parish (now Märjamaa Parish), Harrien County – 15 April 1991 Tallinn) was an Estonian politician. She was a member of II Riigikogu. She was a member of the Riigikogu since 18 February 1924. She replaced Johannes Reesen. On 22 March 1924, she resigned her position and was replaced by Jaak Nanilson. She was married to Bolshevik revolutionary and writer  Jaan Anvelt.

References

1900 births
1991 deaths
People from Märjamaa Parish
People from Kreis Harrien
Workers' United Front politicians
Communist Party of Estonia politicians
Members of the Riigikogu, 1923–1926
Women members of the Riigikogu
Estonian emigrants to the Soviet Union
Estonian communists
Burials at Metsakalmistu